The Osborn School District #8 is an elementary school district in Phoenix, Arizona.

The first teacher of the district, G. W. VanDerzen, received a teaching certificate in 1879. The district considers 1879 as its year of establishment. The first school building, Osborn School #1, opened in 1887.

The district has a bilingual English-Spanish program that began in 1998.

Elementary schools
Clarendon
Encanto
Longview
Montecito
Solano

Middle school
Osborn Middle School

References

External links
 

School districts in Phoenix, Arizona
School districts in Maricopa County, Arizona
1879 establishments in Arizona Territory
School districts established in 1879